Cosmas or Kosmas is a Greek name, from Ancient Greek Κοσμᾶς (Kosmâs),  associated with the noun  κόσμος (kósmos), meaning "universe",  and the verb κοσμέω (to order, govern, adorn)  linked to  propriety. Alternate form: Κοσμίας;  female form: Κοσμώ. It may refer to:

Saints 
 Saints Cosmas and Damian (3rd century AD), Christian martyrs and physicians
 Cosmas the Monk, (7th century AD), a Sicilian monk and tutor
 Cosmas of Maiuma (8th century AD), Syrian bishop and hymnographer
 Cosmas of Aphrodisia (died 1160), Sicilian Bishop and Martyr
 Cosmas of Aetolia (1714-1779), Greek orthodox priestmonk and missionary

Patriarchs 
 Patriarch Cosmas I of Constantinople (fl. 1075–1081), Greek Orthodox Patriarch of Constantinople
 Patriarch Cosmas II of Constantinople (fl. 1146–1147), Greek Orthodox Patriarch of Constantinople
 Patriarch Cosmas I of Alexandria (727-768), Greek Orthodox Patriarch of Alexandria
 Patriarch Cosmas II of Alexandria (fl. 1714–1736), Greek Orthodox Patriarch of Alexandria
 Patriarch Cosmas III of Alexandria (fl. 1737–1746), Greek Orthodox Patriarch of Alexandria
 Pope Cosmas I of Alexandria (fl. 729–730), Coptic Patriarch of Alexandria
 Pope Cosmas II of Alexandria (fl. 851–858), Coptic Patriarch of Alexandria
 Pope Cosmas III of Alexandria (fl. 921–933), Coptic Patriarch of Alexandria

Other people 
 Cosmas the Priest (10th century?), Bulgarian writer
 Cosmas of Prague (1045–1125), Bohemian priest, writer and historian
 Christopher and Cosmas (fl. 1587–1592), Japanese explorers
 Cosmas Damian Asam (1686-1739), German painter and architect
 Cosmas Indicopleustes (fl. 6th century AD), Greek explorer
 Cosmas of Naples (7th century AD), Duke of Naples
 Cosmas Magaya (1953–2020), Zimbabwean mbira player
 Cosmas Ndeti (born 1971), Kenyan marathon runner
 Cosmas Zachos (born 1951), American physicist
 George Cosmas Adyebo (1945-2000), former Prime Minister of Uganda
 Johann Nepomuk Cosmas Michael Denis (1729-1800), Austrian poet, bibliographer and lepidopterist
 Kosmas Chatzicharalabous, former president of the Greek football club AEK Athens F.C.
 Kosmas Kiriakidis, former president of the Greek football club AEK Athens F.C.
 Suzanne Kosmas (born 1944), American politician

Place names 
 Agios Kosmas Olympic Sailing Centre, a facility of the 2004 Summer Olympics at Athens, Greece
 Kosmas, Greece, a municipal unit in Arcadia, Greece
 Kosmas o Aitolos, a municipal unit in Grevena regional unit, Greece

Church buildings 
 Basilica Santi Cosma e Damiano, a church in Rome, Italy
 Church of Cosmas and Damian, a church in medieval Novgorod the Great
 Church of Saint Cosmas and Damian, a church on Lastovo Island, Croatia 
 St Cosmas and St Damian Church, Keymer, a church in West Sussex, England

Other uses
 Kosmas Air, a former Serbian cargo airline
 Kosmas - Czechoslovak and Central European Journal, multidisciplinary bi-annual journal

See also 
 Cosimo (disambiguation)
 Cosma (disambiguation)
 Cosmo (disambiguation)